Group Chat is an American reality television program that aired on Nickelodeon from May 23 to October 31, 2020. It was co-hosted by Annie LeBlanc and Jayden Bartels in its first season, and was hosted by Bartels and Brent Rivera in its second season.

Overview
The program follows the hosts who play games, compete in challenges, and communicate with their guests, virtually via online chat.

Production

On May 6, 2020, it was announced that the show was greenlit under the title Group Chat: The Show to be hosted by Annie LeBlanc and Jayden Bartels, along with Nickelodeon's Unfiltered in the midst of the COVID-19 pandemic, necessitating remote filming, with the show premiering as Group Chat with Annie & Jayden on May 23, 2020.

On August 27, 2020, it was announced that Nickelodeon had ordered seven additional episodes for the series, that began airing on September 5. Previous series guest star Brent Rivera succeeded LeBlanc's previous co-host spot.

Episodes

Series overview

Season 1 (2020)

Season 2 (2020)

Ratings 
 

| link2             = #Group Chat with Jayden & Brent
| episodes2         = 9
| start2            = 
| end2              = 
| startrating2      = 0.27
| endrating2        = 0.35
| viewers2          = |2}} 
}}

References

External links 
 
 

2020s Nickelodeon original programming
2020s American reality television series
2020 American television series debuts
2020 American television series endings
English-language television shows
Television series impacted by the COVID-19 pandemic